Salesian High School is a Catholic high school in Gwangju, South Korea. It was founded in March 1959. It was rated as one of the best private schools in Gwangju four times (in 1998, 1999, 2000, 2002), and nationally acclaimed as one of the best 100 schools in South Korea in 2004.

Notable alumni
U Yun-geun, politician
Kim Wan-seop, journalist
O Yeong-jeong, professional Starcraft player (AnyTime)
Byun Hee-bong, actor
Im Hyun-sik, actor
Jeong Dong-chae, politician, 41st Minister of Culture, Sports, and Tourism from July 2004 to March 2006
Yi Sang-guk, former chairman of the Korea Baseball Organization
Yoon Tae-ho, web-toon writer known for Misaeng and Moss
Yoon Jang-hyeon, mayor of Gwangju since July 2014

See also
 Salesians of Don Bosco

References

External links
  School website
  Alumni website
 Salesian Society - Korea

Salesian schools
Buildings and structures in Gwangju
Educational institutions established in 1959
High schools in South Korea
Catholic schools in South Korea
Boys' schools in South Korea
1959 establishments in South Korea